Myron Samuel Malkin (1924 - 1994) was a U.S. administrator and physicist. Malkin was the father and first director of the U.S. Space Shuttle program from 1973 to 1980.

Malkin was born in Youngstown, Ohio. He served in the United States Marine Corp during World War II. He was involved with the US takeover of Iow Jima. He studied at Yale University eventually earning his Ph.D. there in nuclear physics.

Sources
New York Times obityuary for Malkin

1924 births
1994 deaths
American physicists
American military personnel of World War II
Yale University alumni